Paulo Jacinto is a municipality located in the center of the Brazilian state of Alagoas. Its population is 7,560 (2020) and its area is 108 km².

References

Municipalities in Alagoas